Ronald Dewé Lake (9 May 1891 – 28 July 1950) was an English cricketer active in 1922 who played for Northamptonshire (Northants). He was born in Bury St Edmunds and died in Winkton, Hampshire. He appeared in two first-class matches as a righthanded batsman who scored 48 runs with a highest score of 30.

Notes

1891 births
1950 deaths
English cricketers
Northamptonshire cricketers
Suffolk cricketers
Sportspeople from Bury St Edmunds